The following is a list of notable people who were born, raised or lived in Oklahoma City, Oklahoma. This list should not include professional and college athletes who played in Oklahoma City unless they are originally from there.

Notable people from the state of Oklahoma, but not Oklahoma City or its suburbs, should go in the page titled "List of people from Oklahoma."

People by field

Athletics

Basketball 
 Clay Bennett, owner of the NBA Oklahoma City Thunder franchise
 Antoine Carr, retired basketball player
 Blake Griffin, NBA player for the Brooklyn Nets
 Xavier Henry, former NBA guard
 Alvan Adams, former NBA player for the Phoenix Suns

Baseball 
 Johnny Bench, Cincinnati Reds catcher, Baseball Hall of Fame
 Mike Brumley, former MLB player
 Joe Carter, MLB outfielder, five-time All-Star
 Don Demeter, former MLB outfielder
 Michael Fulmer, MLB pitcher, Detroit Tigers
 Andrew Heaney, MLB baseball player, Los Angeles Angels
 Bobby Murcer, New York Yankees outfielder, five-time All-Star
 Allie Reynolds, former MLB player, six-time World Series Champion as pitcher with the New York Yankees
 Bullet Rogan, former baseball player in the Negro leagues 
 Jeff Suppan, former MLB baseball player
 Mickey Tettleton, former MLB baseball player
 Jamey Wright, former MLB baseball player

Hockey 
 Tyler Arnason, hockey player, Colorado Avalanche
 Matt Donovan, hockey player, drafted in 2008 NHL Draft by the New York Islanders
 Jon Merrill, hockey player, drafted in 2010 NHL Draft by New Jersey Devils; selected in the 2017 expansion draft by the Vegas Golden Knights
 Dan Woodley, retired hockey player, drafted 7th overall in the 1986 NHL Entry Draft by the Vancouver Canucks

Football 
 Dan Bailey (American football), NFL kicker currently playing for the Minnesota Vikings
 Cameron Batson, NFL wide receiver and return specialist for the Atlanta Falcons
 Sam Bradford, NFL player, Heisman Trophy winner
 Mark J. Clayton, Baltimore Ravens wide receiver
 Jimmy Edwards, Canadian Football League player
 Karl Farmer, NFL wide receiver
 Deji Karim, NFL football player with Jacksonville Jaguars and Indianapolis Colts
 Roger Kramer, Canadian Football League player
 Steve Largent, NFL wide receiver
 Alva Liles, NFL player
 Gerald McCoy, NFL player
 Lee Morris, Green Bay Packers wide receiver
 Steve Owens, 1969 Heisman Trophy winner
 Tinker Owens, former NFL football player
 Barry Switzer, national championship and Super Bowl-winning football coach
 Brandon Weeden, NFL football player with the Cleveland Browns and Dallas Cowboys
 Wes Welker, Denver Broncos wide receiver
 Jason White, 2003 Heisman Trophy winner

Golf 
 Bob Tway, 1986 PGA champion
 Kevin Tway, professional golfer

Boxing 
 Sean O'Grady, World Boxing Association Lightweight Champion

Other sports
 Jeff Bennett, track and field coach at Oklahoma Christian University; placed 4th in 1972 Olympics decathlon
 Louise Brough, Hall of Fame tennis player, winner of six Grand Slam championships
 Shane Hamman, Olympic weightlifter, 2000, 2004
 Mat Hoffman, world record holder BMX Rider
 Hayden W. Lingo, Hall of Fame player of the billiards game "One Pocket"
 Jon-Paul Pittman, professional football player for Wycombe Wanderers
 Jim Ross, professional wrestling commentator
 Wayne Wells, Olympic gold medalist in freestyle wrestling at 1972 Summer Olympics, first ever Nike signature athlete
 Bill Watts, professional wrestler and promoter

Business people 
 Clay Bennett, Oklahoma City Thunder owner
 Edward L. Gaylord, owner of Grand Ole Opry and The Oklahoman
 Alan C. Greenberg, Wall Street financier
 Harold Hamm, oil billionaire
 Aubrey McClendon, former CEO of Chesapeake Energy
 J. Larry Nichols, CEO of Devon Energy
 Chad Richison, founder, CEO and chairmanchairman of Paycom
 Tom L. Ward, chairman and CEO at SandRidge Energy; co-founder of Chesapeake Energy

Humanities

Dance
 Yvonne Chouteau, Shawnee Tribe ballerina

Directors and filmmakers
 Gray Frederickson, Academy Award-winning producer
 Ron Howard, actor and director
 Ray William Johnson, vlogger known for the popular Equals Three videos
 Carol Littleton, film editor

Actors and musicians

 Lexi Ainsworth, actress
 Louise Allbritton, actress
 Suzy Amis, actress and model, most notable from film Titanic
 George Back, actor Horrible Bosses, The Pool Boys
 Molly Bee, singer
 Henson Cargill, country singer
 Lon Chaney, Jr., film actor
 Don Cherry, jazz cornetist
 Charlie Christian, musician, "father of the electric guitar"
 Graham Colton, pop music artist
 Mason Cook, actor
 Wayne Coyne, lead singer of the band The Flaming Lips
 Louise Currie, actress
 Robert deMaine, international classical cello virtuoso, composer, and teacher
 Steven Drozd, musician in The Flaming Lips
 Ronnie Claire Edwards, actress, most notable as Corabeth Godsey in The Waltons
 The Flaming Lips, alternative rock band
 Gennifer Flowers, actress
 Matthew Followill, lead guitarist for the band Kings of Leon
 Kay Francis, film actress
 James Garner, actor
 Vince Gill, country singer
 Hinder, alternative rock band
 Mark Holton, actor
 C.B. Hudson, rock guitarist
 Wanda Jackson, member of the Rock and Roll Hall of Fame
 Kenneth Kilgore, musician
 Lauren Lane, actress, most notable as C.C. Babcock in The Nanny
 Rex Linn, actor
 Stacey (Loach) Logan, theater singer and actor 
 Terry Manning, music producer, photographer
 Tisha Campbell Martin, television actress
 Barry McGuire, singer-songwriter
 Ryan Merriman, actor
 Megan Mullally, actress (moved to OKC at age 6)
 Olivia Munn, model, actress and television personality
 Bonnie Owens, country singer
 Gayla Peevey, child singer ("I Want a Hippopotamus for Christmas")
 Dale Robertson, television actor
 Neal Schon, guitarist of Journey
 Smooth McGroove, musician known for a cappella covers of video game music
 Stardeath and White Dwarfs, alternative rock band
 John Michael Talbot, monk and guitarist
 Pamela Tiffin, actress
Katharine Mulky Warne, composer
 Sam Watters, recording artist, member of Color Me Badd
 Mason Williams, recording artist, "Classical Gas"
 Austin Winkler, singer, musician, former member of Hinder
 Jeff Wood, country singer
 Gretchen Wyler, actress

Writers
 Ralph Ellison, novelist
 Kimberly N. Foster, writer and cultural critic
 Louis L'Amour, western author
 Jason Nelson, pioneering digital poet and writer
 Jim Thompson, noir novelist and screenwriter

Visual artists
 Sharron Ahtone Harjo (born 1945), Kiowa painter, ledger artist, and educator
 Tahnee Ahtoneharjo-Growingthunder, Kiowa/Muscogee/Seminole
 Petah Coyne, sculptor
 Benjamin Harjo Jr. (born 1945), Seminole-Absentee Shawnee, painter
 Edgar Heap of Birds (born 1954), Cheyenne-Arapaho Tribes installation artist, painter, conceptual artist
 Huda Kattan, CEO of Huda Beauty, makeup artist
 G. Patrick Riley, mask maker and art educator
 Edward Ruscha, painter
 Richard Ray Whitman (born 1949), Yuchi-Muscogee Creek Nation photographer, painter, installation artist

News, commentary
 Skip Bayless, author, sports journalist and TV personality, ESPN First Take
 Gary England, former chief meteorologist of KWTV-DT 1972-2013.
 Mike Morgan, chief meteorologist of KFOR-TV since 1993.
 Dan Fagin, Pulitzer Prize-winning author and journalist
 James J. Kilpatrick, journalist most famous for his regular segment on 60 Minutes 
 Anthony Shadid, Pulitzer Prize-winning correspondent for The New York Times

Political figures
 David Boren, former Governor and U.S. Senator
 Michael D. Brown, FEMA head during Hurricane Katrina
 David Dank, member of the Oklahoma House of Representatives 2007–2015
 Odilia Dank, former member of the Oklahoma House of Representatives, 1995–2006
 Mickey Edwards, former Congressman
 Bryce Harlow, lobbyist and Eisenhower advisor
 David Holt, Mayor
 Ernest Istook, former Congressman
 Frank Keating, former Governor
 Robert S. Kerr, former Governor and U.S. Senator
 Jeane Kirkpatrick, Ambassador to the United Nations
 George Nigh, former Governor
 Russell M. Perry, former Oklahoma Secretary of Commerce
 Elizabeth Warren, U.S. Senator and 2020 Presidential candidate
 J.C. Watts, University of Oklahoma football player and former Congressman
 Mac Q. Williamson, former Attorney General of Oklahoma

Other
 Rick Bayless, celebrity chef
 Jay Bernstein, Hollywood producer and manager
 Jennifer Berry, Miss America 2006 
 Sweet Brown, YouTube sensation of "Ain't Nobody Got Time For That"
 Gordon Cooper, astronaut 
 Mick Cornett, former Mayor of Oklahoma City; former television personality
 Mary Fallin, Governor of Oklahoma since 2010; former congresswoman
 Darci Lynne, Ventriloquist, winner of America's Got Talent, Season 12
 Owen Garriott, astronaut 
 Robert Harlan Henry, President of Oklahoma City University, former federal judge on the U.S. Court of Appeals for the Tenth Circuit
 John Herrington, astronaut 
 Jerome Holmes, federal judge on U.S. Court of Appeals for the Tenth Circuit
 Jane Anne Jayroe, Miss America 1967
 Shibani Joshi, national television reporter
 Sante Kimes, American conwoman and serial killer 
 Shannon Lucid, astronaut
 Clara Luper, civil rights activist
 Chelsea Manning, transgender U.S. Army former intelligence analyst convicted by court-martial for crimes related to the 2010 WikiLeaks scandal
 William A. Martin, computer scientist, artificial intelligence pioneer
 Dr. Donna J. Nelson, University of Oklahoma Chemistry Professor, 2016 ACS President, and science advisor to Breaking Bad
 Lauren Nelson, Miss America 2007
 Eugene Nida, linguist and translator
 William Reid Pogue, astronaut 
 Wiley Post, aviator
 Susan Powell, Miss America 1981, opera singer
 Kevin Samuels, Youtuber
 Norma Smallwood, Miss America 1926
 Shawntel Smith, Miss America 1996
 Thomas P. Stafford, astronaut

Non-native Oklahoma City residents
 Archbishop Emeritus Eusebius J. Beltran, Roman Catholic Archdiocese of Oklahoma City, former Bishop of Tulsa 
 Brian Bosworth, linebacker for the University of Oklahoma (1984–1986) and the Seattle Seahawks of the National Football League (1987–1989)
 Jacob Aldolphus Bryce (Delf A. 'Jelly' Bryce), was an Oklahoma City detective and FBI agent, who was an exceptional marksman and fast draw noted for his dress sense.
 Paul and Thomas Braniff, Braniff Airlines co-founders
 Cattle Annie, or Anna Emmaline McDoulet Roach, female bandit, lived in Oklahoma City from 1912 until her death in 1978
 Greyson Chance, singer
 Kristin Chenoweth, actress and singer
 Mark J. Clayton, Baltimore Ravens wide receiver
 Archbishop Paul Stagg Coakley, Incumbent, Roman Catholic Archdiocese of Oklahoma City, former Bishop of Salina, Kansas
 Walter Cronkite, CBS Evening News anchor
 Glen Day, professional golfer
 Amy Grant, Contemporary Christian artist
 Todd Hamilton, professional golfer, British Open Champion
 Ed Harris, actor
 Chris Harrison, host of ABC's The Bachelor
 Mary Hart, TV personality
 Anthony Kim, professional golfer
 Marian P. Opala, Justice of the Oklahoma Supreme Court and member of the Polish Underground in World War II
 Blessed Rev. Fr. Stanley Rother, from suburban Okarche, Oklahoma, 1st native-born U.S. citizen to be a martyr, and to be beatified in the U.S.
 Billy Sims, football player, 1978 Heisman Trophy winner
 Jerry Spann, United States Chess Federation president (1957–1960); FIDE vice-president 
 Scott Verplank, professional golfer
 Hobart Johnstone Whitley, banker, treasurer for Chicago Rock Island & Texas Railroad 1892–1894
 Bud Wilkinson, OU football coach, broadcaster, College Football Hall of Fame
 "Dr. Death" Steve Williams, WWE champion wrestler; two-time All-American football player; four-time All-American wrestler at OU
 Willie Wood, professional golfer

U.S. service members
 Admiral William J. Crowe (USN), Chairman of the Joint Chiefs of Staff

References

Oklahoma city
Oklahoma